Camila Sosa Villada (born 28 January 1982) is a transgender Argentine writer and theatre, film, and television actress.

Biography
On 28 January 1982, Camilia Sosa Villada was born in La Falda, Argentina,  from the city of Córdoba. Throughout her childhood, she moved around the Córdoba Province, living in a number of cities including Cruz del Eje, Los Sauces, Mina Clavero, and Córdoba.

She studied for three years of Social Communication at the National University of Córdoba's School of Information Sciences and another four years for her bachelor's degree at the same university.

In 2009, Villada premiered her play Carnes tolendas, retrato escénico de un travesti [Carnes Tolendas, an on-stage portrayal of a travesti], a biodrama of her life which fused her personal experiences that she recorded on her blog, La Novia de Sandro [Sandro's Girlfriend], with the poetry of Federico García Lorca. The play, directed by María Palacios and revised by Paco Giménez, was selected for the 2010 National Theater Festival held in La Plata.

In 2011, Javier van de Couter, filmmaker, actor, scriptwriter and author of the script of the Argentine drama miniseries Tumberos, cast Sosa Villada in a minor role in the film Mía, but later offered her the starring role after watching her in Carnes tolendas in Córdoba.

In March 2010, the actress spent several months in Buenos Aires working with the Rojas Cultural Centre, which has a department for works relating to gender. Sosa Villada had the chance to perform Carnes tolendas in May 2010. She performed a sold-out show in the Buenos Aires International Festival (FIBA), which was well received by critics.

Filming for Mía finished on 15 May 2010. She then spent another 15 days recording the dubbing for her character.

In June 2010, Carnes tolendas was selected to be shown at the Theatre Students Bicentennial, a festival which brings together theatre students from all over the country.

In 2012, Sosa Villada starred in the La viuda de Rafael (The Widow of Rafael), a miniseries which consisted of 13 episodes, which was aired from November to December that same year. She starred as Nina, the transsexual wife of a wealthy businessman (played by Luis Machín) who, after her husband dies in an accident, must fight for what's hers against her spiteful in-laws.

On 7 August 2013, the Argentine Government granted her a new national identity card (DNI), updated with the name Camila Sosa Villada, and the gender she identifies as.

Work

Stage 
Sources: Alternative Teatral

Film

Television

Literature

Awards 

 Sosa Villada has received the following awards as an actress and singer:
 Awarded best stage actress by the Municipality of Cordoba.
 Special mention at the Teatro del Mundo awards in Buenos Aires for Carnes tolendas, retrato escénico de un travesti.
 Recognised for her contribution to theatre by the Legislative Authority of the Province of Córdoba.
 Honoured by the Secretariat for Human Rights of the Province of Córdoba.

See also 

 Theatre in Argentina
 Cinema in Argentina
 Travesti (gender identity)
 Transgender
 LGBT rights in Argentina

References

Living people
1982 births
Argentine film actresses
Argentine stage actresses
Argentine television actresses
National University of Córdoba alumni
Transgender actresses
Transgender writers
Argentine LGBT writers
Argentine LGBT actors
Argentine transgender people
People from Córdoba Province, Argentina
21st-century Argentine LGBT people